The 1988 Arab Junior Athletics Championships was the third edition of the international athletics competition for under-20 athletes from Arab countries. It took place in Damascus, Syria – the first time the event was staged in West Asia. A total of 41 athletics events were contested, 23 for men and 18 for women. Morocco, a regional power in the sport, did not send a team. Syria entered for the first time.

Several changes were made to the event programme, bringing it into line with the standard set by the 1988 World Junior Championships in Athletics. The men's 30 km road race was changed to a 20 km distance. The 15 km road walk was replaced by a 10,000 m track walk. The steeplechase distance was also extended from 2000 to 3000 m. Two new women's events were added: a 10,000 metres and a 5000 km track walk. The women's walk pre-dated the introduction of such an event at either the Arab Athletics Championships (1989) or the Pan Arab Games (1992), making it a first for the region.

The medal table was close, with Algeria, Syria and Tunisia each winning seven gold medals. Tunisia topped the table through their eight silver medals to Syria's six. Egypt was also close behind with six gold medals and nine silver medals. Jordan and Oman won their first gold medals in the competition's history.

Ibrahim Ismail Muftah was the most successful athlete of the championships, winning all three individual men's sprints. He was an Olympic finalist the following year. Noureddine Morceli of Algeria, winner of the 1500 metres, was the most important athlete to emerge from the tournament: we would later win three world titles and an Olympic gold in his specialism. Men's shot put winner Bilal Saad Mubarak of Qatar become one of the finest throwers of the region: he was in the top two at the Asian Athletics Championships from 1991 to 2003 and won three straight titles at the Pan Arab Games. Sherif Farouk El Hennawi of Egypt was a clear winner in the hammer throw and would win several African titles in his career. Double long-distance medallist Alyan Sultan Al-Qahtani later won an Asian title.

On the women's side, Hend Kebaoui defended her 400 metres hurdles title and added a 400 metres gold medal and 100 metres silver to that honour. Egypt's Huda Hashem Ismail won both the 100 metres hurdles and heptathlon titles (repeating the feat of Yasmina Azzizi from 1984). Karima Meskin Saad was a medallist in all the women's sprints. All of these athletes won multiple regional titles in their senior careers.

Medal summary

Men

Women

Medal table

References

Arab Junior Athletics Championships
International athletics competitions hosted by Syria
Sport in Damascus
Arab Junior Athletics Championships
Arab Junior Athletics Championships
20th century in Damascus
1988 in youth sport